Megumi Satsu (Japanese: 薩 めぐみ,  14 February 1948, Sapporo, Japan - 18 October 2010, Paris) was an eccentric French-Japanese singer. 

Megumi Satsu released a few singles in Japan early in her career and then moved to France at the end of the seventies. She was discovered by Jacques Prevert who wrote an album of new songs especially for her. Some additional albums were recorded in the following years with the collaboration of some of the most famous French writers; Roland Topor, Jean Baudrillard, William Cliff and Frédéric Mitterrand (who was the Minister of Culture in France under Nicolas Sarkozy's presidency). These recordings were released in collaboration with famous musicians like Serge Perathoner or Patrick Vasori, to name just a few. With her alternative repertoire, her expressionist interpretation and her charismatic personality, Mégumi  became the icon of an alternative underground generation and the muse of modists who saw in her the new Marlene Dietrich with an Asian touch. She had the opportunity to sing some French poems written by the famous writer and poet Jacques Prévert. Just a few years before dying, Prévert saw Satsu on TV; he was fascinated by her voice and her personality. He told his wife that Satsu would be perfect for interpreting some of his unedited texts. Prévert's wife contacted Megumi Satsu after her husband died and she took on the project.
Megumi Satsu was a friend of Jean Baudrillard, the famous French sociologist. He also wrote two songs for her, "Motel Suicide" and "Lifting Zodiacal".
Roland Topor was captivated too by this "lady in black" wearing strange hats. She knows how to use her mysterious look. He wrote two songs, "Monte dans mon Ambulance" et "Je m'aime".
Megumi Satsu mostly performed in French, though she did record some songs in Japanese and English. Megumi Satsu was also inspired by the 1930s,  such as interpreting Bertold Brecht in French.

Discography 

 1979 : Megumi Satsu chante Prévert (LP)
 1980 : Zozo Lala, Kaze/Normandie (45T)
 1980 : Je m'aime (LP)
 1984 : Silicone Lady (Motel suicide) (LP)
 1986 : Give back my soul (maxi 45T)
 1986 : Silicone Lady (Motel suicide) (reissue)
 1987 : Chante Prévert (reissue)
 1991 : Du vent à la folie (CD single 2 tracks)
 2002 : Sombre dimanche (compilation, 1 track)
 2006 : Chansons littéraires des années 30
 2008 : Complete discography digitally reissued
 2008 : En concert au Bataclan 1984
 2009 : Après ma mort
 2011 : Remixes VOL1
 2011 : Remixes VOL2
 2011 : Je m'aime, en concert (1980)
 2011 : Give back my soul, (The Complete Story)
 2011 : Ma petite annonce (7 versions)
 2011 : Chansons inédites et versions alternatives
 2012 : Rebirth (Remixes vs DJ Wen!ngs)
 2014 : Megumi Satsu et Claude Rolland interprètent Cocteau, Brecht et Prévert (1974)
 2014 : Silicone Lady (Motel Suicide) Deluxe Expanded
 2015 : Stage Tokyo 1982 (live recording)
 2015 : Prévert Récital Tokyo 1982 (live recording)

External links 
 megumisatsu.com

1948 births
2010 deaths
20th-century Japanese women singers
20th-century Japanese singers
Musicians from Sapporo
Japanese expatriates in France
20th-century French women singers